This is a list of trade unions in Australia.  The peak body for unions in Australia is the Australian Council of Trade Unions.

Current trade unions

Former trade unions

Australia
Trade unions